Kwon Oh-joong (born November 24, 1971) is a South Korean actor. He is best known for starring in Gourmet (2008), as well as the television series The Secret Lovers (2005), Freedom Fighter, Lee Hoe-young (2010), and Miss Ajumma (2011). Kwon has also appeared in films such as To Catch a Virgin Ghost (2004) and Mr. Kim vs. Mr. Kim vs. Mr. Kim (also known as Master Kims, 2007).

Kwon is also certified as a level 2 social worker, and is known for his volunteer activities. He founded the organization 천사를 돕는 사람들의 모임 ("A Group of Angels Who Help Others") in 2002.

Filmography

Television series
Bravo My Life(SBS, 2017)
Five Enough (KBS2, 2016)
Empress Ki (MBC, 2013)
A Hundred Year Legacy (MBC, 2013)
Arang and the Magistrate (MBC, 2012) 
Scent of a Woman (SBS, 2011) (cameo, ep 8)
Miss Ajumma (SBS, 2011)
The Duo (MBC, 2011) 
Freedom Fighter, Lee Hoe-young (KBS1, 2010)
Life is Good (MBC, 2009)
Gourmet (SBS, 2008)
Unstoppable High Kick! (MBC, 2007) (cameo, ep 101)
MBC Best Theater "Loveholic Project" (MBC, 2005) 
The Secret Lovers (MBC, 2005)
Pingguari  (SBS, 2005)
Island Village Teacher (SBS, 2004)
Match Made in Heaven (MBC, 2004)
Damo (MBC, 2003)
Hello! Balbari (KBS2, 2003)
Why Can't We Stop Them (SBS, 2000-2002)
Joa, Joa (SBS, 2000)
Love Story "Insomnia, Manual and Orange Juice" (SBS, 2000)
People's Houses (KBS1, 1999)
Winners (SBS, 1998)
I Love You, I'm Sorry (KBS2, 1998)
Soonpoong Clinic (SBS, 1998-2000)
Yesterday (MBC, 1997)
The Angel Within (KBS2, 1997)
MBC Best Theater "Subway Line 2 Platform"  (MBC, 1997)
TV City (MBC, 1995)
Salut D'Amour (KBS2, 1994)

Film
The Disciple John Oak  (documentary, 2014) (narration)
Kong's Family (2013)
Addiction (documentary, 2013) (narration)
The Forgotten Bag (2011)
One Step Forward (2010) (cameo)
His Last Gift (2008)Miss Gold Digger (2007) The Houseguest and My Mother (2007) (cameo)Bunt (2007)Mr. Kim vs. Mr. Kim vs. Mr. Kim (2007)Princess Aurora (2005)To Catch a Virgin Ghost (2004)Spring Bears Love (2003)Tube (2003)Reward (short film, 2003)If It Snows on Christmas (1998)The Young Man (1994)

Variety showHope TV SBS (2022) - Host with children Law of the Jungle in Solomon Islands (2014)I Am a Man (2014)Nine to Six (2013) The Wife Doesn't Know  (2013)Saturday Night Live Korea (2012-10-06) Finding Delicious TV (2012-05-05) Come to Play (2012) Korea's Talk Show Hello (2012) Movieholic (2011) Showdown! Star Chef (2009) 
대결천하 (2001)

Music videos
한동근 (Han Dong Geun) 잘 헤어진 거야 (Farewell) - January 22, 2020

Cookbook authorGood Eats: Healthy Meal Stories Told by a Dad (2010)

Awards
2012 20th Korean Culture and Entertainment Awards: Best Supporting Actor (Arang and the Magistrate'')
2012 Ministry of Health and Welfare commendation
2009 Ministry of Health and Welfare commendation
2006 Volunteer of the Year Award
2005 선행칭찬상 시상식 대중예술부문 선행상
1999 SBS Drama Awards: Popularity Award

References

External links
 
 
 

1971 births
Living people
Male actors from Seoul
South Korean male television actors
South Korean male film actors
21st-century South Korean male actors